Ghosts is the fourth solo studio album by Australian singer Wendy Matthews released in Australia by rooArt on 25 August 1997. The album debuted and peaked at number 43 in Australia.

The album was nominated for ARIA Award for Best Adult Contemporary Album at the ARIA Music Awards of 1998 but lost out to Looking for Butter Boy by Archie Roach.

Track listing
 "Break the Girl" - 4:31
 "Then I Walked Away" - 4:31	
 "Your Slight Admiration" - 5:09	
 "Big" - 3:34	
 "I Lied" - 2:22	
 "Beloved" - 4:30	
 "Ten Miles of Timber" - 4:43	
 "Halcyon Days" - 4:40	
 "Soul Debt" - 4:40	
 "Ghosts"	- 4:07
 "My Secret" - 2:08	
 "Find Me Here" - 3:04	
 "Mountains" - 5:11

Charts

References

1997 albums
Wendy Matthews albums